Lucius Lucceius, Roman orator and historian, friend and correspondent of Cicero. A man of considerable wealth and literary tastes, he may be compared with Atticus. In 59 BC, Lucius attempted to run for Consul on a joint ticket with Gaius Julius Caesar, and was generally seen as the financier of the campaign and an olive branch to both Cicero and the Optimates, expected to ride in on Caesar's coattails. However, he failed to be elected Consul, with Bibulus, an Optimate, getting the second place spot and becoming Caesar's Co-Consul instead of Lucius. Disgusted at his failure to become consul in 59 BC, he retired from public life, and devoted himself to writing a history of the Social and Civil Wars. This was nearly completed, when Cicero earnestly requested him to write a separate history of his (Cicero's) consulship. Cicero thought that a panegyric by Lucceius, who had taken considerable interest in the affairs of that critical period, would have great weight in his campaign to rehabilitate himself after the exile stemming from his consulship. Cicero offered to supply the material, and hinted that Lucceius need not sacrifice laudation to accuracy. Lucceius almost promised, but did not perform. Subsequently, Cicero had to sing his own praises in both Greek and Latin, but nothing remains of any such work or of his history. In the civil war he took the side of Pompey; but, having been pardoned by Caesar, returned to Rome, where he lived in retirement until his death.

References
Cicero's Letters, specifically Ad Familiares v.12.

Lucceius
Lucceius
Lucceius
Lucceius
1st-century BC Romans